The 2020–21 season of Clube Desportivo Primeiro de Agosto is the club's 43rd season in the Girabola, the Angolan Premier football League and 43rd consecutive season in the top flight of Angolan football. In 2020–21,  the club is participating in the Girabola, the Angola Cup and the 2020–21 CAF Champions League.

Squad information

First team

Out on loan

Staff

Pre-season transfers

Mid-season transfers

Overview

Pre-season and friendlies

Angolan League

League table

Match details

Results

Results by round

Results summary

CAF Champions League & Confederation Cup

Results summary

Playoff round
The COVID-19 policy of the Angolan health authorities was not aligned with that of CAF and as a result, following 4 Namungo players having tested positive for COVID-19, the Angolan health authorities ruled that the match was not to be held. As part of the COVID-19 protocol in use in Angola, Namungo FC claimed to have been subject to inhuman, harsh treatment from the Angolan authorities. CAF ruled that both matches were to take place in Tanzania, even though they acknowledged that none of the clubs were to blame for the match not being held. D'Agosto feared that some kind of retaliation was expected from the Tanzanian side for the alleged inhuman treatment that they had allegedly been subject to in Luanda. Only ninety minutes away from the first leg match, the Tanzanian health authorities announced that five D'Agosto players had tested positive for COVID-19, a confirmation test or one by an independent lab was denied and D'Agosto was in disbelief when it was announced that the five players were no other than the five most influential players in the team, all of whom from the initial line-up, including goal-keeper Neblú, centrebacks Bobo Ungenda and Bonifácio Caetano, central midfielder Mário Balbúrdia and the team's top scorer Mabululu. The stage had carefully been set for an easy win by Namungo, with the aggravating circumstance that the D'Agosto players in the makeshift team that was hastily assembled for the match, were psychologically affected by the way that their teammates were discarded.

Results summary

Angola Cup

Round of 16

Quarter-finals

Semi-finals

Statistics

Appearances

Scorers

Assists

Clean sheets

Disciplinary record

Season progress

See also
 List of C.D. Primeiro de Agosto players

External links
 Official website
 Facebook profile
 Zerozero.pt profile
 Match schedule

Notes

References

C.D. Primeiro de Agosto seasons
Primeiro de Agosto